Otwell is a historic home at Oxford, Talbot County, Maryland.  It is a brick house composed of two major parts, the first constructed around 1720–1730, and the other part around 1800–1810. The earliest portion of the building consists of the westerly gambrel roofed structure with a "T"-shaped plan. At the base of the "T" are appended three small sections with varying roof lines, constructed in the first decade of the 19th century. The interior retains the original floor plan but the decorative detailing was extensively restored following a fire in 1958.

It was listed on the National Register of Historic Places in 1982.

References

External links
, including photo from 1975, at Maryland Historical Trust
Otwell, Otwell Road, Oxford vicinity, Talbot, MD at the Historic American Buildings Survey (HABS)

Houses in Talbot County, Maryland
Houses on the National Register of Historic Places in Maryland
Houses completed in 1725
Historic American Buildings Survey in Maryland
1725 establishments in Maryland
National Register of Historic Places in Talbot County, Maryland